
Łęczyca County is a unit of territorial administration and local government (powiat) in Łódź Voivodeship, central Poland. It came into being on January 1, 1999, as a result of the Polish local government reforms passed in 1998.

As of 2006 its total population is 53,435, out of which the population of Łęczyca is 15,423 and the rural population is 38,012.

Neighbouring counties
Łęczyca County is bordered by Kutno County to the north, Łowicz County to the east, Zgierz County to the south-east, Poddębice County to the south-west and Koło County to the west.

Administrative division
The county is subdivided into eight gminas (one urban and seven rural). These are listed in the following table, in descending order of population.

References
Polish official population figures 2006

 
Land counties of Łódź Voivodeship